Edward Darrell may refer to:

 Edward Darrell (died 1573), MP for Plympton Erle
 Edward Darrell (died 1530), MP for Wiltshire

See also
Edmund Darrell, MP